Nejc Cehte (born 4 September 1992) is a Slovenian handball player who plays for GOG Håndbold and the Slovenian national team.

At the 2020 European Men's Handball Championship, he represented the Slovenian national team.

Cehte was raised in Stolovnik, Slovenia. His older brother, Klemen Cehte, inspired him to play handball.

Honours
GOG Håndbold
 Danish Handball Cup: 2022

References

External links

1992 births
Living people
People from Brežice
Slovenian male handball players
Expatriate handball players
Slovenian expatriate sportspeople in Germany
Slovenian expatriate sportspeople in Denmark
Handball-Bundesliga players
Mediterranean Games competitors for Slovenia
Competitors at the 2018 Mediterranean Games
20th-century Slovenian people
21st-century Slovenian people